Pseudotritonia is a small genus of sea slugs.

Species in it include:

 Pseudotritonia antarctica (Odhner, 1934)
 Pseudotritonia gracilidens (Odhner, 1944)
 Pseudotritonia quadrangularis (Thiele, 1912)

References

External links
  Odhner N. H. (1934). The Nudibranchiata of British Antarctic Expedition. British Antarctic ("Terra Nova") Expedition, 1910. Natural history reports. Zoology. 7: 229-310

Marine gastropods
Gastropod genera
Nudibranchia